Aug. 31 - Eastern Orthodox liturgical calendar - Sep. 2

All fixed commemorations below celebrated on September 14 by Orthodox Churches on the Old Calendar.

For September 1st, Orthodox Churches on the Old Calendar commemorate the Saints listed on August 19.

Feasts
 Start of the Indiction, beginning the Liturgical Year.
 Protection of the Environment Day (Eastern Orthodox Earth Day) (1989)

Saints
 Righteous Joshua, the son of Nun (c. 16th century BC)
 Martyrs Callista and her brothers Evodos and Hermogenes at Nicomedia (309)
 Holy 40 virgin-martyrs and their teacher the Hieromartyr Ammon the Deacon at Heraclea in Thrace (321-323):
 Laurencia the deaconess; Celsina; Theoclia; Theoctista; Dorothy; Eutychia; Thecla; Aristaineta; Philadelphia; Mary; Veronica; Euthymia; Lamprotatia; Euphymia; Theodora; Theodota; Teteia; Aquilina; Theodulia; Aplodora; Lampadia; Procopia; Paula; Junilla; Ampliana; Percissa; Polynicia; Maura; Gregoria; Kyriake; Bassa; Callinica; Barbara; Cyriena; Agathonica; Justa; Irene; Timothea; Tatiana; and Anna.
 Martyr Aeithalas the Deacon of Persia (380)
 Venerable Martha, the mother of St Simeon Stylites (428)
 Venerable Simeon Stylites the Elder (459)
 Venerable Evanthia.
 Saint Dionysius Exiguus, inventor of the Anno Domini (AD) era (c. 544)
 Saint Symeon Stylites of Lesbos (c. 845)

Pre-Schism Western saints
 Hieromartyr Priscus of Capua, first Bishop of Capua in Italy, where he was sent by the Apostle Peter, and martyred under Nero by tradition (c. 66)
 Hieromartyr Terentian, Bishop of Todi in Umbria in Italy, under Hadrian (118)
 Virgin-martyr Vibiana, in Rome, whose relics are now venerated in Los Angeles, of which she is the main patron-saint (3rd century)
 Saint Sixtus of Reims, first Bishop of Rheims in France (c. 300)
 Hieromartyr Firminus of Amiens, third Bishop of Amiens in France (c. 303)
 The 12 Holy Brothers, Martyrs, who suffered in the south of Italy and were brought together and enshrined at Benevento in 760 (c. 303):
 Donatus, Felix, Arontius, Honoratus, Fortunatus, Sabinian, Septimius, Januarius, another Felix, Vitalis, Sator, and Repositus.
 Saint Verena of Zurzach (Switzerland) (c. 350)
 Saint Victorius (Victurius), a disciple of St. Martin of Tours who became Bishop of Le Mans in France in c. 453 (c. 490)
 Saint Constantius of Aquino, Bishop of Aquino in Italy (c. 520)
 Saint Regulus (San Regolo), exiled from North Africa by the Arian Vandals, he landed in Tuscany in Italy and was martyred under Totila (545)
 Saint Lupus of Sens, a monk at Lérins who became Bishop of Sens in France in 609 (623)
 Saint Nivard of Rheims, Archbishop of Rheims in France (673)
 Saint Giles of Nîmes (Aegidius), monastic founder along the Rhone (c. 712)
 Saint Lythan (Llythaothaw), a saint in Wales to whom two churches are dedicated.
 Saints Giles (Aegidius) and Arcanus, founded a monastery that later grew into Borgo San Sepulcro in central Italy (1050)

Post-Schism Orthodox saints
 Saint Meletius the Younger, of Thebes (1105)
 Venerable Nicholas of Courtaliatis in Crete, monk (1670)
 New-Martyr Angelis of Constantinople (1680)
 Venerable Anthony of Agyia.
 Saint Haido of Stanos (1820-1821)

New Martys and Confessors
 Virgin-martyrs Tatiana Gribkov and Natalia Kozlov (1937)

Other commemorations
 Commemoration of the Great Fire of Constantinople (c. 470)
 Synaxis of the Most-Holy Theotokos of Miasena Monastery, in memory of the finding of her icon (864)
 Celebration of the first miracle of the Icon of the Theotokos (Eletskaya) at Chernigov-Gethsemane (Chernihiv-Hefsemanska) (1869)
 Celebration of the "All-Blessed" or "Pamakarista" Icon (11th century) of Our Lady of Kazan (1905)

Icon gallery

Notes

References

Sources 
 September 1/14. Orthodox Calendar (PRAVOSLAVIE.RU).
 September 14 / September 1. HOLY TRINITY RUSSIAN ORTHODOX CHURCH (A parish of the Patriarchate of Moscow).
 September 1. OCA - The Lives of the Saints.
 September 1. Latin Saints of the Orthodox Patriarchate of Rome.
 The Roman Martyrology. Transl. by the Archbishop of Baltimore. Last Edition, According to the Copy Printed at Rome in 1914. Revised Edition, with the Imprimatur of His Eminence Cardinal Gibbons. Baltimore: John Murphy Company, 1916. pp. 266–267.
 Rev. Richard Stanton. A Menology of England and Wales, or, Brief Memorials of the Ancient British and English Saints Arranged According to the Calendar, Together with the Martyrs of the 16th and 17th Centuries. London: Burns & Oates, 1892. p. 433.

 Greek Sources
 Great Synaxaristes:  1 ΣΕΠΤΕΜΒΡΙΟΥ. ΜΕΓΑΣ ΣΥΝΑΞΑΡΙΣΤΗΣ.
  Συναξαριστής. 1 Σεπτεμβρίου. ECCLESIA.GR. (H ΕΚΚΛΗΣΙΑ ΤΗΣ ΕΛΛΑΔΟΣ).

 Russian Sources
  14 сентября (1 сентября). Православная Энциклопедия под редакцией Патриарха Московского и всея Руси Кирилла (электронная версия). (Orthodox Encyclopedia - Pravenc.ru).
  1 сентября по старому стилю / 14 сентября по новому стилю. Русская Православная Церковь - Православный церковный календарь на  год.

September in the Eastern Orthodox calendar